Crypsiptya mutuuri is a moth in the family Crambidae. It was described by Rose and Pajni in 1979. It is found in India (Uttar Pradesh).

References

Moths described in 1979
Pyraustinae